N36 may refer to:
 N36 (Long Island bus), a former bus route in Nassau County
 Aeroflot Flight N-36, which crashed in 1976
 , a submarine of the Royal Navy
 N36 motorway (Netherlands)
 Nebraska Highway 36, in the United States
 Negeri Sembilan State Route N36, now Malaysia Federal Route 3265
 Wotje Airport on Wotje Atoll, Marshall Islands